"Freestyle" is a song by American rapper Lil Baby. It was released on November 5, 2017 with an accompanying music video, to promote his mixtape Too Hard (2017). The song became one of his most popular hits and helped him rise to prominence. The song is a sleeper hit which began charting outside of the United States in 2022.

Composition
In the song, Lil Baby raps about his usage of lean and percocets, over production by Joseph DaVinci. He gives numerous name-drops, including that of basketball player Philip Champion, and also interpolates "Hail Mary" by Tupac Shakur.

Charts

Weekly charts

Year-end charts

Certifications

References

2017 singles
2017 songs
Lil Baby songs
Songs written by Lil Baby